David John Denzil Davies   (9 October 1938 – 10 October 2018) was a Welsh Labour Party politician. He served for 35 years as the Member of Parliament (MP) for Llanelli from 1970 to 2005, and was a member of the Privy Council.

Early life
Davies was born in Cynwyl Elfed, Carmarthenshire. He attended Queen Elizabeth's Grammar School for Boys in Carmarthen, and then Pembroke College, Oxford, where he graduated with a First Class Honours BA in Law and Gray's Inn where he qualified as a barrister. He lectured in Law at University of Chicago in 1963 and the University of Leeds from 1964. He practised at the tax bar between 1967 and 1975. Later he also practised in the field of personal injuries and served as a head of chambers.

Parliamentary career
Davies unsuccessfully sought the Labour nomination for the 1966 Carmarthen by-election, losing out to Gwilym Prys-Davies.

Davies was elected in the 1970 general election as the Member of Parliament for Llanelli. He would go on to be appointed as a Treasury Minister in James Callaghan's Government. He was a Eurosceptic, and he campaigned against Britain's entry into the EEC. He also opposed the National Assembly for Wales. 

Davies served in a number of posts when Labour formed the Official Opposition after the election of Margaret Thatcher in 1979, including Shadow Secretary of State for Wales in Michael Foot's Shadow Cabinet and Shadow Secretary of State for Defence in Neil Kinnock's. Like his predecessor as Shadow Defence Secretary, John Silkin, he resigned from the front bench in June 1988 in protest at Neil Kinnock's management style. The trigger for his resignation was Kinnock's announcement, without reference to Davies or the Shadow Cabinet, of a change in Labour's defence policy, from unilateral nuclear disarmament to multilateral nuclear disarmament and then back to unilateral nuclear disarmament, over a period of three days. He made an unsuccessful bid for the Labour Party deputy leadership in 1983.

He was one of the few Labour MPs with ministerial experience at the time of the 1997 landslide that returned the party to power after 18 years in opposition. As a backbencher Davies continued to oppose Britain's membership of the EU.

He stood down at the 2005 general election, and was replaced by Nia Griffith. He died on 10 October 2018.

Personal life
He married Mary Ann Finlay in 1963. They had a son and daughter. They divorced in 1988. He married Ann Carlton in 1989.

Publications
Booth: Residence and Domicile in U.K. Taxation (successive editions)
Maximise Damages, Minimise Taxes (1993)
World Trade Organisation and GATT (1994) 
The Galilean and the Goose – How Christianity converted the Roman Empire (2010 )

References

External links 
 BBC profile (outdated)
 They Work for You
 

1938 births
2018 deaths
Welsh Labour Party MPs
Alumni of Pembroke College, Oxford
Members of the Privy Council of the United Kingdom
UK MPs 1970–1974
UK MPs 1974
UK MPs 1974–1979
UK MPs 1979–1983
UK MPs 1983–1987
UK MPs 1987–1992
UK MPs 1992–1997
UK MPs 1997–2001
UK MPs 2001–2005
Members of Gray's Inn
Academics of the University of Leeds
University of Chicago Law School faculty
People educated at Queen Elizabeth High School, Carmarthen
Members of the Parliament of the United Kingdom for Carmarthenshire constituencies